Tungiro-Olyokminsky District is an administrative and municipal district (raion), one of the thirty-one in Zabaykalsky Krai, Russia. It is located in the northeast of the krai, and borders with Kalarsky District in the north, Mogochinsky District in the south, and with Tungokochensky District in the west. Its administrative center is the rural locality (a selo) of Tupik. Population:  1,643 (2002 Census);  The population of Tupik accounts for 67.8% of the district's total population. Other rural localities include Gulya and Srednyaya Olyokma.

Geography 
The district is located in the Olyokma-Stanovik Highlands area. The Olyokma and the Tungir, one of its main tributaries, flow across it.

History
The district was established on January 6, 1927.

Economy
The district is rich with gold, silver, lead, and other natural resources.

References

Notes

Sources